The Kurdistan Brigades, also known as al-Qaeda in Kurdistan or al-Qaeda's Kurdish Brigades, are a militant Islamist organization, primarily active in the northern Iran–Iraq border. It is the Kurdish branch of al-Qaeda that has launched several attacks on the Kurdistan Regional Government in northern Iraq. The group was classified as a terrorist organization by the US State Department on January 1, 2012.

Formation
AQKB was founded in 2007, after the apparent disbandment of Ansar al-Islam, another al-Qaeda-affiliated group. The group is considered to be relatively small, but it has camps in the Iranian towns of Mariwan and Sanandaj.

Attacks
The group has launched several attacks, including its largest one being against KRG's Ministry of Interior in Erbil that killed 19 people in May 2007. AQKB killed 7 border guards and one PUK security officer in Penjwan in July 2007. In September 2010, two police officers were hurt by a failed suicide attack in Sulaymaniyah.

References

Branches of al-Qaeda
Jihadist groups
Geography of Iraq
Kurdish Islamic organisations
Kurdish Islamism
Organizations designated as terrorist by the United States